Sankarankovil Taluk is a taluk of Tenkasi district of the Indian state of Tamil Nadu. The headquarters is the town of Sankarankoil.

Demographics
According to the 2011 census, the taluk of Sankarankoil had a population of 349,050 with 172,250  males and 176,800 females. There were 1026 women for every 1000 men. The taluk had a literacy rate of 68.4. Child population in the age group below 6 was 16,923 Males and 16,384 Females.

List of Villages 
List of Places in Sankarankovil Taluk Tirunelveli District:

 A.Madurapuri
 Achampatty
 Alagapuri
 Alankulam
 Palaya Appaneri
 Arianayagipuram
 Athipatti
 Ayyaneri
 Chatrakondan
 Chatrapatti
 Chenthattiapuram
 Chettikulam
 Chidhambarapuram
 Chinnakovilankulam
 Chitrampatti
 Devarkulam
 Duraisamy Puram
 Echandha
 Elanthaikulam
 Ilayarajanendal
 Jamin Devarkulam
 K.Karisalkulam
 Kalapalankulam
 Kalappakulam
 Kalingapatti
 Karisal Kulam
 Karisathan
 Karivalamvandanallur
 Keela Veerasigamani
 Keelaneelithanallur
 Ko-Maruthappapuram
 Kulakattakuruchi
 Kulasekaramangalam
 Kulasekaraperi
 Kurukkalpatti
 Kurunjakulam
 Kuruvikulam
 Kuvalaikanni
 Lakshmiammalpuram
 Madathupatti
 Madurapuri
 Mahendravadi
 Maipparai
 Malaiyankulam
 Manalur
 Mangudi
 Maruthenkinaru
 Mela Ilandaikulam
 Melaneelithanallur
 Moovirunthali
 Mukkuttumalai
 Naduvakurichi Major
 Naduvakurichi Minor
 Naduvapatti
 Nakkalamuthampatti
 Nalanthula
 Naluvasankottai
 Narikudi
 Nochikulam
 Panaiyur
 Panthapuli
 Paruvakkudi
 Pattataikatti
 Pazhamkottai
 Peria Kovilankulam
 Periyur
 Perumalpatti
 Perumbathur
 Perunkottur
 Pillaiyarnatham
 Pitchaithalaivanpatti
 Poigai
 Puliangulam
 Punnaivanam
 Ramalingapuram
 Ramanathapuram
 Rengasamudram
 S.V.Puram Karadiyudaippu
 Sangarankoil
 Sangupatti
sathirakondan
 Sennikulam
 Sernthamangalam
 Sevalkulam
 South Kuruvikulam
 Subbulapuram
 Sundankurichi
 Sundaresapuram
 Thadiampatti
 Therkku Sankarankovil
 Thiruvengadam
 Thiruvettanallur
 Usilangulam
 Usilankulam
 Vadakku Panavadaly
 Vadakku Pudur
 Vadakku Puliampatti
 Vadakkupatti
 Vadikottai
 Vagaikulam
 Vanniconendal
 Varaganoor
 Vayali
 Vazhavandhapuram
 Veerasigamani
 Veeriruppu
 Vellakulam
 Vellalankulam
 Vellappaneri
 Venkatachalapuram
 Vijayarengapuram
 moovirunthali

References 

Taluks of Thirunelveli district